Emma Jane Callaghan (28 February 1884 - 31 December 1979) was an Australian Aboriginal midwife, Indigenous rights/ activist supporter, nurse and Indigenous Culture Recorder.

Born a twin to a Tharawal mother in La Perouse, New South Wales. At age thirteen although barely educated herself, Callaghan became a teacher within an Aboriginal settlement in Bellbrook, New South Wales. Emma lived on this settlement for twenty-five years alongside Retta Long helping with childbirth, birth registration, and the ill.

She was proficient in needlework and was also a translator of the Dhanggati language, the tongue of her first husband's tribe, working with biblical tales. Her new home in Armidale was later visited by Ellen Kent Hughes. On the same year as her second husband's death, she met Princess Marina of Greece and Denmark. She died in Randwick, New South Wales.

References

1884 births
1979 deaths
People from New South Wales
Indigenous Australian people
Australian midwives